Dianolaelaps is a genus of mites in the family Laelapidae.

Species
 Dianolaelaps gryllus Y. M. Gu & Q. X. Duan, 1990

References

Laelapidae